Bland Abavu (born 10 May 1990), also known as Oti Bland Tony, is a Papua New Guinean rugby league footballer who plays for the PNG Hunters in the Queensland Cup.

References

1990 births
Living people
Papua New Guinea Hunters players
Papua New Guinea national rugby league team players
Rugby league fullbacks